The Distinguished Sea Service Award is an annual award of the Naval Order of the United States recognizing a recently retired flag or general office of the maritime services of the United States.

History
In 1998, Captain John Brasel of the New York Commandery of the Naval Order of the United States proposed that the Order give an annual award "to recognize the exemplary service of a senior flag officer of one of the maritime services, who is finishing a continuous career of active service." The award is always made in a formal ceremony, preferably during the Naval Order's annual congress. Admiral William J. Crowe, Jr., was the first recipient in 1990.

Recipients
 1990 Admiral William J. Crowe, Jr., USN (Ret.)
 1991 General Alfred M. Gray, Jr., USMC (Ret.)
 1992 Admiral Paul A. Yost, Jr., USCG (Ret.)
 1993 Admiral Carlisle A.H. Trost, USN (Ret.)
 1994 Vice Admiral John H. Fetterman, Jr., USN (Ret.)
 1995 Admiral David E. Jeremiah, USN (Ret.)
 1996 General Walter E. Boomer, USMC (Ret.)
 1997 Admiral Stanley R. Arthur, USN (Ret.)
 1998 Admiral Leighton W. Smith, USN (Ret.)
 1999 Admiral Robert E. Kramek, USCG (Ret.)
 2000 Admiral Joseph W. Prueher, USN (Ret.)
 2001 General Anthony C. Zinni, USMC (Ret.)
 2002 Admiral Archie Clemins, USN (Ret.)
 2003 Admiral James Loy, USCG (Ret.)
 2004 Admiral Robert J. Natter, USN (Ret.)
 2005 Admiral James O. Ellis, USN (Ret.)
 2006 Admiral Vern Clark, USN (Ret.)
 2007 Admiral Thomas Fargo, USN (Ret.)
 2008 General James L. Jones, USMC (Ret.)
 2009 Admiral William J. Fallon, USN (Ret.)
 2010 General Peter Pace, USMC (Ret.)
 2011 Admiral Thad W. Allen, USCG (Ret.)
 2012 Admiral Michael Mullen, USN (Ret.)
 2013 Admiral Timothy J. Keating, USN (Ret.)
 2014 General James Mattis, USMC (Ret.)
 2015 MCPON Rick West, USN (Ret.)
 2015 Admiral James G. Stavridis, USN (Ret.)
 2016 SMMC Micheal Barrett, USMC (Ret.)
 2016 Admiral Robert J. Papp Jr., USCG (Ret.)
 2017 MCPOCG Michael P. Leavitt, USCG (Ret.)
 2017 Admiral Jonathan Greenert, USN (Ret.)

References

United States Navy
United States Coast Guard
United States Marine Corps
Military awards and decorations of the United States
Awards and decorations of the United States Navy